Rewild  is the debut album by Amazing Baby and it was released on June 22, 2009. The album received a varied response from critics, and did not chart in either Europe or the United States.

Track listing
"Bayonets"
"Invisible Palace"
"Kankra"
"Headdress"
"Dead Light"
"Deerripper"
"Old Tricks In Hell"
"The Narwhal"
"Roverfrenz"
"Smoke Bros"
"Pump Yr Brakes"

Personnel
Amazing Baby
Don Devore
Matt Abeysekera
Rob Laakso
Simon O'Connor
Will Roan

Additional musicians
Tianna Kennedy
Max Siegel
Jesse Peterson
Ben Goldwasser
Gillian Rivers
Will Berman
Sam Decker
Mike Shobe
Max Decker
Kristina Lieberson
James Richardson
Avery Devore
Sam Kulik

References

External links
Official Website

2009 debut albums
Amazing Baby albums